Alois Fürstner (born 23 July 1962) is an Austrian chemist. He is director of Organometallic Chemistry at the Max Planck Institute for Coal Research in Mülheim, Germany.

He was elected a member of the German Academy of Sciences Leopoldina in 2002.

References

1962 births
20th-century Austrian scientists
20th-century chemists
21st-century Austrian scientists
21st-century chemists
Austrian chemists
Members of the German Academy of Sciences Leopoldina
Living people
Max Planck Institute directors